Cory Vitarelli (born June 30, 1985 in Peterborough, Ontario) is a Canadian professional lacrosse player who plays for the Philadelphia Wings of the National Lacrosse League and the Peterborough Lakers of Major Series Lacrosse. Vitarelli scored the NLL's first ever series-ending overtime goal in a mini-game in the 2014 NLL Playoffs.

National Lacrosse League career
Vitarelli was signed by the Rochester Knighthawks in December 2010, while playing his final season of college hockey at the University of Prince Edward Island with the expectation that he would join the Knighthawks after his team's hockey season concluded. After an unexpected early exit from the playoffs by his college hockey team, Vitarelli made his NLL debut with the Knighthawks on March 26, 2011, scoring 2 goals and assisting on another. He followed that up in his second game a week later with a hat trick. Vitarelli finished his brief 2011 regular season with 7 goals and 6 assists in 6 games played. The Knighthawks won 5 of those 6 games. Vitarelli made his NLL playoff debut with the Knighthawks on May 1, 2011 in a 10-8 loss to the Toronto Rock.

Vitarelli's career-highs for regular-season goals and points came in 2012, when he had 29 goals and 46 points. His career-high for regular-season assists is 19 in 2013.

Vitarelli was a member of the Knighthawks three consecutive Champion's Cup winners in 2012, 2013 and 2014.

Canadian box lacrosse 
As a junior, Vitarelli played six years for Peterborough Lakers Jr. A in the Ontario Junior A Lacrosse League from 2001 to 2006. He was a member of their Minto Cup championship team in 2006. Since 2007, Vitarelli has played for the Peterborough Lakers of Major Series Lacrosse. He has been a member of three Mann Cup championship teams with the Lakers in 2007, 2010 and 2012.

Mann Cup
2007 - Member of Peterborough Lakers, winners of the Mann Cup, MSL champions
2010 - Member of Peterborough Lakers, winners of the Mann Cup, MSL champions
2012 - Member of Peterborough Lakers, winners of the Mann Cup, MSL champions
Bible of Lacrosse Player Stats

Statistics

National Lacrosse League
Reference:

Canadian Lacrosse Association

References

1985 births
Living people
Canadian expatriate lacrosse people in the United States
Canadian lacrosse players
Lacrosse forwards
Lacrosse people from Ontario
Rochester Knighthawks players
Sportspeople from Peterborough, Ontario